St John the Baptist's Church, Ault Hucknall, is a Grade I listed parish church in the Church of England in Ault Hucknall, Derbyshire.

History

The church dates from the 11th century with 14th- and 15th-century features. It was restored between 1885 and 1888 by William Butterfield.

Parish status
The church is in a joint parish with
St Andrew's Church, Glapwell
St Leonard's Church, Scarcliffe
St Luke's Church, Palterton

Memorials

Anne Keighley, wife of William Cavendish, 1st Earl of Devonshire
Thomas Hobbes (d. 1679)

Organ

The pipe organ was installed by Brindley & Foster around 1905. A specification of the organ can be found on the National Pipe Organ Register.

See also
Grade I listed churches in Derbyshire
Listed buildings in Ault Hucknall

References

Church of England church buildings in Derbyshire
Grade I listed churches in Derbyshire
William Butterfield buildings